Milorad Gođevac (1 March 1860 – 21 September 1933) was the organizer of the Serbian Chetnik Organization, a doctor by profession.

Life
Born in Valjevo, Principality of Serbia, he finished the First Belgrade Gymnasium and finished medicine at the University of Vienna in 1889. He was the organizer of the Serbian armed action in South Serbia and Macedonia and founder of the first Volunteer Board. 

The Chief Staff of the Chetnik Organization (the Serbian Committee) was established in 1902. The members were, among others, Gođevac, Luka Ćelović, Vasa Jovanović, Žika Rafailović, Nikola Spasić and Ljuba Kovačević.

See also

Serb revolutionary organizations
List of Chetnik voivodes

References

20th-century Serbian people
Serbian nationalists
Military personnel from Valjevo
Serbian diplomats
People from the Kingdom of Serbia
1860 births
1933 deaths
Serbian Chetnik Organization
Serbian physicians